Saptapadi is a ritual in a Hindu marriage.

Saptapadi may also refer to:
 Saptapadi (1961 film), a Bengali film by Ajoy Kar
 Saptapadi (1981 film), a Telugu film by K. Vishwanath
 Saptapadi (1922 film), a Kannada film by Bhargava